Pete versus Life is a Channel 4 sitcom created by George Jeffrie and Bert Tyler-Moore. It stars Rafe Spall and the first episode was aired on 6 August 2010. It was recommissioned for a second series after averaging 1.6 million viewers and a young demographic during its first run, and series two started airing on 21 October 2011.

Synopsis
The programme follows the misadventures of Pete Griffiths, a budding sports journalist in London struggling with both his personal and professional life, dealing with issues such as relationships and trying to find work as a major reporter. He often finds himself in socially awkward situations and can never quite find the right things to say. Whilst he goes about his everyday doings, he is commentated on by two announcers as if his life were a sports broadcast. The two commentators often cringe at the humiliating positions Pete ends up in, and are unprofessional in their approach. One of the commentators, Terry McIllroy, is an ex-professional footballer and is loosely based on real life co-commentator and former Sky Sports pundit, Andy Gray.

Cast
 Rafe Spall as Pete Griffiths
 Joseph Kloska as Rob
 Pippa Duffy as Anna
 Reece Ritchie as Ollie
 Chris Geere as Kurt
 Daniel Ings as Jake Oakman
 Philip Jackson as Frank Griffiths 
 Susannah Fielding as Chloe Richardson
 Scarlett Alice Johnson as Trish
 Simon Greenall as Colin King
 Ian Kirkby as Terry McIlroy
 Catherine Russell as Jen

Episode list

Series 1

Series 2

International broadcast
In Australia, series one of this programme commenced airing on ABC2 each Tuesday at 9pm from 18 October 2011. Series two commenced airing on ABC2 each Tuesday at 9pm from 6 March 2012.

References

External links

2010 British television series debuts
2011 British television series endings
Channel 4 sitcoms
Comedy Showcase
Television shows set in London
Television series by All3Media